Margarya mansuyi is a species of large operculate freshwater snail, an aquatic gastropod mollusk in the family Viviparidae, the river snails.

Distribution 
The distribution of Margarya mansuyi includes Xingyun Lake and Qilu Lake in Yunnan Province, China.

The former distribution of this species also included Yilong Lake, Dian Lake and Datunhai Lake (Datun Lake).

Description 
Shu et al. (2010) provided details about the shell and about the radula.

References

Viviparidae